Alyas Pogi: Ang Pagbabalik is a 1999 Filipino action film directed by Joey del Rosario. Ramon "Bong" Revilla Jr. reprises his role as the titular policeman. The film is the third and final installment of the Alyas Pogi film series.

Plot
Henry "Alyas Pogi" Cruz (Bong) is released from prison after serving a 12-year sentence. He returns home and realized that his son Paris (Carlo) was adopted by Mang Ben (Ray), who also preserved his former getup and his katana. Despite being reunited with his son, he realized that Mang Ben and his fellow farmers are being threatened by Mayor Villegas (Tonton) and his henchmen led by his brother Leo (Jeffrey) to leave their place to give way to the construction of a casino. Convinced by Mang Ben, he dons his Alyas Pogi persona and uses his old ways to eliminate the Mayor's henchmen.

Cast

 Ramon "Bong" Revilla, Jr. as Henry "Alyas Pogi" Cruz
 Ara Mina as Roselle Acosta
 Tonton Gutierrez as Mayor Villegas
 Jeffrey Santos as Leo Villegas
 Efren Reyes as Capt. Perez
 Carlo Aquino as Paris
 Gio Alvarez as Tonyo
 Ray Ventura as Ben Acosta
 Archie Adamos as Atty. Costales
 William Lorenzo as Atty. Victor Simon
 Arbie Antonio as Lazaro
 Archie Ventosa as Rafael Aragon
 Jessette Prospero as Elsa Aragon
 Gerald Ejercito as Jake
 R.G. Gutierrez as Rico
 Ronald Asinas as Gardo
 Rona Manuel as Lulu
 Jaira Gomez as Mariel Simon
 Florante Tagulo as Amador
 Girlie Alcantara as Desta
 Bien Ojeda as Tomas
 Muriel Apuyan as Olivia
 Eric Francisco as a security guard
 Ina Alegre as Leo's girl
 Eileen Tinio as Elementary Teacher
 Dante Castro as Kanor
 Susan Corpuz as Aling Selina
 Marivic Sales as Paula
 Jerry Sacdalan as Ka Ambo

Awards and nominations

References

External links

1999 films
1990s action drama films
1999 drama films
Filipino-language films
Films set in the Philippines
Philippine action drama films
Star Cinema films
Films directed by Joey del Rosario